Douglas da Silva Vieira (born November 12, 1987) is a Brazilian professional footballer who plays as a striker for J1 League club, Sanfrecce Hiroshima.

Career statistics

Club
.

References

External links
Profile at Tokyo Verdy
Profile at Sanfrecce Hiroshima

1987 births
Living people
Brazilian footballers
Allsvenskan players
J1 League players
J2 League players
Clube Atlético Juventus players
Esporte Clube Juventude players
Clube Náutico Capibaribe players
Kalmar FF players
Tokyo Verdy players
Sanfrecce Hiroshima players
Brazilian expatriate footballers
Expatriate footballers in Sweden
Expatriate footballers in Japan
Association football forwards